The Sipsey Fork of the Black Warrior River is a  river located in the U.S. state of Alabama, and is formed by the junction of Thompson and Hubbard creeks in the Sipsey Wilderness of Bankhead National Forest. The Sipsey Fork discharges into the Mulberry Fork.  The Sipsey Fork below Lewis Smith Lake is one of the few places within the state to catch rainbow trout.

References

Rivers of Alabama
Rivers of Lawrence County, Alabama
Wild and Scenic Rivers of the United States
Alabama placenames of Native American origin